This is a non-comprehensive list of inflatable manufactured goods, as no such list could ever completely contain all items that regularly change. An inflatable is an object that can typically be inflated with a gas, including air, hydrogen, helium and nitrogen. Some can be inflated with liquids, such as waterbeds and water balloons.

Inflatable manufactured goods

A
 Air dancer
 Air mattress
 Air-supported structure
 Air Swimmer
 Armbands (swimming aids)

B
 Balloon
 Balloon helicopter
 Balloon rocket
 Balloon tank (for rockets)
 Thundersticks
 Toy balloon
 Water balloon
 Balloon (aircraft)
 Ball for team handball
 Barrage balloon
 Basketball
 Beach ball
 Billboard
 Bubble wrap
 Buoyancy compensator (scuba diving)

C
 Cage ball

D
 Delayed surface marker buoy
 Dunnage bag also known as airbags

E
 Exercise ball

F
 Football (ball)
 Football also known as a soccer ball
 Football the ball used in American football
 One world futbol
 Penny floater

G
 Gamow bag primarily used for treating severe cases of altitude sickness
 Goodyear Inflatoplane

I
 Inflatable
 Inflatable air cushion
 Inflatable arch
 Inflatable armbands
 Inflatable boat

 Arancia class lifeboat
 Combat Rubber Raiding Craft
 Cutter Boat – Over the Horizon
 D class lifeboat (EA16)
 D class lifeboat (IB1)
 Halkett boat
 Inflatable Rescue Boat
 LCRL
 LCRS
 Rigid-hulled inflatable boat
 ULYZ
 X class lifeboat
 XP class lifeboat
 Y class lifeboat

 Inflatable building
 Inflatable castle
 Inflatable costume
 Inflatable movie screen
 Inflatable pool
 Inflatable rat
 Inflatable rubber dam
 inflatable safety belt
 Inflatable space habitat
 Inflatable tunnel
 Inner tubes

K
 Kamifūsen
 Kayak
 Kite
 * Inflatable single-line kite
 * Leading edge inflatable kite
 Kytoon

M
 Medical devices
 Adjustable gastric band
 Balloon catheter

P
 Personal flotation device some are inflated with air or from carbon dioxide gas canisters
 Pneumatic bladder

R
 Rugby ball

S
 Sex doll
 Skyball
 Space hopper
 Survival suit
 Swim ring
 Sleeping pad

T
 Tent some tents have inflatable pole supports, also known as airbeams
 Tire
 :Category:Tires

V
 Volleyball

W
 Water ball
 Water polo ball
 Water slide
 Whoopee cushion
 Waterbed

Z
 Zeppelin

See also
 Bubble Wrap (brand)

References

 
Manufacturing-related lists